Onyekachi Hope Ugwuadu (born 5 May 1997), commonly known as Kachi, is a Nigerian footballer who plays as either a winger or striker.

Career

Club
Kachi signed for Sarpsborg 08 in August 2015 from Gee Lec IFA in his native Nigeria.

On 31 March 2017, Kachi joined Norwegian First Division club Bodø/Glimt on loan for the 2017 season.

On 29 July 2022, Kachi joined Saudi Arabian club Al-Taraji.

Career statistics

Club

References

1997 births
Living people
Nigerian footballers
Association football forwards
Sarpsborg 08 FF players
FK Bodø/Glimt players
Strømmen IF players
Sandnes Ulf players
Odds BK players
Al-Taraji Club players
Eliteserien players
Norwegian First Division players
Nigerian expatriate footballers
Expatriate footballers in Norway
Nigerian expatriate sportspeople in Norway
Expatriate footballers in Saudi Arabia
Nigerian expatriate sportspeople in Saudi Arabia